Parazumia is a Neotropical and Nearctic genus of medium to large sized potter wasps. The Nearctic species of this genus have been treated for much of the 20th century as a separate genus named Paranortonia.

References

 Carpenter, J.M. & Garcete-Barrett, B.R. 2005. Revision of the genus  Parazumia de Saussure (Hymenoptera: Vespidae; Eumeninae). Folia Entomol. Mex., 44 (supl. 1): 21–34.

Potter wasps